Durham Viaduct is a grade II* listed railway viaduct in the City of Durham in County Durham, in North East England. The viaduct is an important local landmark, and carries the East Coast Main Line railway, it is immediately south of Durham railway station.

It is made from sandstone with ashlar dressings, and brick soffits.

The viaduct dates from 1857, and was probably built by Thomas Elliot Harrison for the North Eastern Railway. It was originally part of a branch line, the Durham to Bishop Auckland Line, however it was later incorporated into what became the East Coast Main Line, when two new lines were opened to Gateshead to the north, in 1868, and from Durham to Tursdale Junction and Darlington to the south in 1872.

The viaduct became grade II* listed in 1970.

References

Buildings and structures in Durham, England
Grade II* listed buildings in County Durham
Railway viaducts in County Durham
East Coast Main Line